The Thunatae (Ancient Greek: Θουνᾶται) were a Dardanian tribe, along with the Galabri, mentioned by Strabo. The Thunatae are mentioned as neighbors of the Maedi, a Thracian tribe.

Name 
The tribe is mentioned by Ancient Greek author Strabo in his Geographica as  Thunatai. The tribal name Thunatae/Thunatai has been connected to the Messapic name Daunioi/Daunii in Apulia (south-eastern Italy).

Geography 
According to Strabo the Thunatae were a Dardanian tribe who bordered with the Thracian Maedi in the east.

It has been suggested that the Thunatae may have been a Thracian people or probably strongly influenced by the neighbouring Thracians. However Strabo explicitly considers the Thunatae as a Dardanian people, also separating them from the Thracian tribe Maedi, hence from the Thracians. Strabo's account provides evidence that in their eastern territory the Dardanians bordered the Thracians.

See also

Dardania (Roman province)
List of ancient tribes in Illyria

References

Bibliography 

Dardanians
Illyrian tribes
Thracian tribes
Ancient tribes in Bulgaria
Ancient tribes in Kosovo
Ancient tribes in North Macedonia
Dardania (Roman province)
Illyrian Kosovo
Illyrian North Macedonia